This is an incomplete list of Jails and prisons listed on the National Register of Historic Places.  Included are:

Alabama
 Houston Jail, Houston, Alabama, NRHP listed
 Old Jail (Gordo, Alabama), Gordo, Alabama, NRHP listed
 Coosa County Jail,  Rockford, Alabama, NRHP listed

Connecticut
 Fairfield County Jail, listed on the NRHP in Bridgeport, Connecticut

Florida
 Old Hamilton County Jail, listed on the NRHP in Jasper, Florida
 Old St. Johns County Jail, listed on the NRHP in St. Augustine, Florida
 Old Taylor County Jail, listed on the NRHP in Perry, Florida

Georgia
 Old Jail (Washington, Georgia), listed on the NRHP in Wilkes County
 Quitman County Courthouse and Old Jail, listed on the NRHP in Georgetown
 Rockdale County Jail in Conyers, Georgia, listed on the NRHP in Rockdale County

Illinois
 Franklin County Jail (Illinois), listed on the NRHP in Illinois

Iowa
Dubuque County Jail, listed on the NRHP in Iowa
 Old Jail (Muscatine, Iowa), listed on the NRHP in Iowa
Pottawattamie County Jail, listed on the NRHP in Iowa
Scott County Jail, listed on the NRHP in Iowa

Louisiana
 Beauregard Parish Jail
 Old St. Helena Parish Jail, in Greensburg

Massachusetts
Charles Street Jail, listed on the NRHP in Boston, Massachusetts (North)
 Old Jail (Barnstable, Massachusetts), listed on the NRHP in Massachusetts

Minnesota
 Aitkin County Courthouse and Jail, in Aitkin
 Crow Wing County Courthouse and Jail, in Brainerd
 Elizabeth Village Hall and Jail, in Elizabeth
 Fillmore County Jail and Carriage House, in Preston
 Houston County Courthouse and Jail, in Caledonia
 Le Sueur County Courthouse and Jail, in Le Center
 Lincoln County Courthouse and Jail, in Ivanhoe
 Minnesota Home School for Girls, in Sauk Centre
 Minnesota State Reformatory for Men Historic District, in St. Cloud
 Minnesota State Training School, in Red Wing
 Minnesota Territorial Prison, in Stillwater (demolished and delisted)
 Nicollet County Courthouse and Jail, in St. Peter
 Odessa Jail, in Odessa
 Park Rapids Jail, in Park Rapids
 Renville County Courthouse and Jail, in Olivia
 Rice County Courthouse and Jail, in Faribault
 Rock County Courthouse and Jail, in Luverne
 Sibley County Courthouse and Sheriff's Residence and Jail, in Gaylord
 State Prison Historic District, in Bayport
 Stearns County Courthouse and Jail, in St. Cloud (jail demolished)
 Todd County Courthouse, Sheriff's House, and Jail, in Long Prairie (jail demolished)
 Walters Jail, in Walters

Montana
 Fallon County Jail, in Baker
 Belt Jail, listed on the NRHP in Belt, Montana
 Gallatin County Jail, listed on the NRHP in Bozeman, Montana
 Ismay Jail, in Custer County
 Lodge Grass City Jail, listed on the NRHP in Lodge Grass, Montana
 Granite County Jail, listed on the NRHP in Philipsburg, Montana
 Square Butte Jail, listed on the NRHP in Square Butte, Montana
 Sanders County Jail, listed on the NRHP in Thompson Falls, Montana
 Troy Jail, in Lincoln County

Oregon
 Clatsop County Jail (Old), listed on the NRHP in Astoria, Oregon

South Carolina
 Florence Stockade, in Florence County
 South Carolina Penitentiary, former listing (demolished)
 Oconee County Cage, in Walhalla
 Oconee County Jail, former listing (demolished)

Tennessee
 Old Scott County Jail, listed on the NRHP in Huntsville, Tennessee
 Old Fentress County Jail, listed on the NRHP in Jamestown, Tennessee
 Lawrence County Jail, listed on the NRHP in Lawrenceburg, Tennessee
 Old Bedford County Jail,  in Shelbyville
 Claiborne County Jail, in Tazewell
 Franklin County Jail (Tennessee), listed on the NRHP in Winchester, Tennessee

Texas
 Austin County Jail, listed on the NRHP in Bellville, Texas
 Bowie County Jail, listed on the NRHP in Boston, Texas
 Old Cameron County Jail, listed on the NRHP in Brownsville, Texas
 Brown County Jail, listed on the NRHP in Brownwood, Texas
 Bosque County Jail, listed on the NRHP in Meridian, Texas
 Anderson County Jail, listed on the NRHP in Palestine, Texas
 Coke County Jail, listed on the NRHP in Robert Lee, Texas

Virginia
 Old Fauquier County Jail, in Warrenton

Wisconsin
 Kenosha County Courthouse and Jail, in Kenosha
 Marquette County Courthouse and Marquette County Sheriff's Office and Jail, in Montello
 New Glarus Town Hall, in Green County
 Pepin County Courthouse and Jail, in Durand

Wyoming
 Clearmont Jail, in Sheridan County

See also
 List of jail and prison museums

Jails